Newtonbrook Secondary School (Newtonbrook SS, NSS) is a high school for Grades 9 to 12 in the Newtonbrook neighborhood in Toronto, Ontario, Canada.

History
Opened in 1964 by the then North York Board of Education to provide a closer school for the area (formerly served by Earl Haig Secondary School to the south) with 610 pupils. It was officially opened in Winter 1965 by Newtonbrook-born and then Prime Minister of Canada Lester B. Pearson.

The building's design resembled Sir Sanford Fleming Academy but alterations occurred years later.

It is considered to be one of the more sports-oriented high schools in the Toronto District School Board. Some of the athletics offered are: rugby, basketball, soccer, track, ultimate, volleyball, baseball, softball, cheerleading, dance team, water polo, cross country running, swimming, badminton and wrestling. Newtonbrook's football program was coached by then-city councillor and future mayor Rob Ford until 2001 when he confronted a student.

Some elective academic programmes offered are: French immersion, fashion design, dance, music and a thorough computer science program.

The sports field is used by the Toronto City Saints rugby team of the Canada Rugby League.

Notable alumni 
 J'Michael Deane CFL Player Ottawa Red Blacks, Former Calgary Stampeder, Graduate Michigan State University 
 Elizabeth Cull, Minister of Health (1991+); Minister of Finance (1993–95), British Columbia, Canada.
 Lisa Feldman Barrett, University Distinguished Professor of Psychology, Northeastern University
 Mark Bluvshtein, Russian-born Canadian chess grandmaster
 Shane Kippel, Canadian television actor
 Geddy Lee, born Gary Lee Weinrib, singer (Rush)
 Mark Napier, retired NHL Player (Minnesota North Stars, Montreal Canadiens, Edmonton Oilers and Buffalo Sabres); former head coach for the Toronto St. Michael's Majors
 Steve Shutt, retired NHL player Montreal Canadiens and Los Angeles Kings
 Shawn Gore, former NFL player, Green Bay Packers and CFL player B.C. Lions
 Howie Mandel, Comedian and Actor 
 Michael Wex (né Weczs), Yiddish-language scholar and theorist, best selling North American humorist
 Boris Cherniak, Comedian, Hypnotist, and Author

Specialist High Skills Major
Specialist High Skills Major (SHSM) is a specialized program offered at Newtonbrook which allows students to focus their education on a specific area of learning, while meeting the requirements for the Ontario Secondary School Diploma. It is a beneficial opportunity that prepares students for post-secondary education in the field of their choice, as well as helping in the transition into apprenticeship or workplace destinations. Upon having completed the SHSM program students receive a special designation on their high school diploma, indicating their achievement.

See also
List of high schools in Ontario

Footnotes

External links

 Newtonbrook S.S. TDSB Website

High schools in Toronto
Schools in the TDSB
Educational institutions established in 1964
1964 establishments in Ontario